Prairie Township, Arkansas may refer to:

 Prairie Township, Arkansas County, Arkansas
 Prairie Township, Ashley County, Arkansas
 Prairie Township, Boone County, Arkansas
 Prairie Township, Carroll County, Arkansas
 Prairie Township, Craighead County, Arkansas
 Prairie Township, Franklin County, Arkansas
 Prairie Township, Hot Spring County, Arkansas
 Prairie Township, Johnson County, Arkansas
 Prairie Township, Lonoke County, Arkansas
 Prairie Township, Madison County, Arkansas
 Prairie Township, Marion County, Arkansas
 Prairie Township, Newton County, Arkansas
 Prairie Township, St. Francis County, Arkansas
 Prairie Township, Searcy County, Arkansas
 Prairie Township, Sebastian County, Arkansas
 Prairie Township, Washington County, Arkansas
 Prairie Township, Yell County, Arkansas

See also 
 List of townships in Arkansas
 Prairie Township (disambiguation)

Arkansas township disambiguation pages